USS O'Toole has been the name of more than one United States Navy ship, and may refer to:

 USS O'Toole (DE-327), a destroyer escort renamed  in 1943 while under construction
 , a destroyer escort in commission from 1944 to 1945

United States Navy ship names